Stewart Till, CBE (born 1951) was the chairman and chief executive of United International Pictures from 2002 to 2006. He is a graduate of the University of Bath.

Till was deputy managing director of British Sky Broadcasting's movie channels and joined PolyGram Filmed Entertainment in January 1992 as President of its international distribution arm before joining Universal Pictures International (UPI), where he became president and one of the most important film people in London. He left UPI in 2000 and became chairman and chief executive at UIP. After leaving UIP, he was Chairman of Icon Productions UK and then became CEO of Sonar Entertainment in 2012.

In 1999, he was appointed vice chairman of the new UK Film Council. He became chairman after Alan Parker left.

In July 2006 he was awarded an honorary doctorate by the University of Essex.

References

Alumni of the University of Bath
Commanders of the Order of the British Empire
1951 births
Living people